Disneyland is the original Disney theme park in Anaheim, California.

Disneyland may also refer to:

Properties of The Walt Disney Company

Theme parks
 Tokyo Disneyland
 Disneyland Park (Paris), formerly "Euro Disneyland"
 Hong Kong Disneyland
 Shanghai Disneyland

Resort complexes

 Disneyland Resort in Anaheim, California
 Disneyland Paris, formerly "Euro Disney Resort" and "Disneyland Resort Paris"
 Hong Kong Disneyland Resort

Media
 Disneyland, the title of the Walt Disney anthology television series from 1954 to 1958
 Disneyland: The First 50 Magical Years, a film presentation on the history of Disneyland Park in Anaheim, California

Other uses
Disneyland, a 1965 novel by Stanisław Dygat, basis for the film Jowita (1967)
"Disneyland with the Death Penalty", a 1993 magazine article by William Gibson about Singapore
"Dizz Knee Land", a song by the rock group dada
"Disneyland", a solo song in the Broadway musical Smile
"Disneyland", a song by Five For Fighting on the album The Battle for Everything
"Disneyland" (Modern Family), an episode of the third season of the American comedy television series Modern Family
"2 Weeks In Dizkneeland", a song by Nuno Bettencourt on the album Schizophonic
Disneyland Dream, a home movie documentary made in the 1950s
Hamtramck Disneyland, a tourist destination in Hamtramck, Michigan, United States

See also

Disneyland Hotel (disambiguation)
Dreamland in Nara, Japan
Hong Kong Disneyland Resort
Magic Kingdom
Shanghai Disney Resort
Tokyo Disney Resort
Walt Disney World